The karate competition at the 2018 Central American and Caribbean Games was held in Barranquilla, Colombia from 25 to 27 July at the Coliseo Colegio Marymount.

Medal summary

Men's events

Women's events

Medal table

See also
Karate at the 2019 Pan American Games – Qualification

References

External links
2018 Central American and Caribbean Games – Karate 

2018 Central American and Caribbean Games events
Central American and Caribbean Games
2018
Karate in Colombia
Qualification tournaments for the 2019 Pan American Games